Woldemar Carl von Daehn (20 February 1838 in Sippola – 28 December 1900) was a Finnish politician. He was a member of the Senate of Finland and Minister–Secretary of State for Finland.

Biography
His family was originally from Braunschweig in Germany, where his grandfather stepped into service for Russia. Through his wife the grandfather became a landowner in Finland in 1784. His sons Johan, Alexander, and Karl were entered into the House of Nobility in 1836. Johan and Karl became soldiers and Alexander, the only one with a university education, farmed land. Marrying Maria Charlotta Amalia von Wilde, he had six children of whom Woldemar was the second youngest. The oldest of the sons, Alexander Gustaf, inherited the Sippola mansion. Like two of his older brothers, Woldemar went to Hamina Cadet School.

Over the years he progressed through the ranks first in the Finnish military and then the Imperial Russian Army, becoming a colonel in 1869. In 1871, he married noblewoman Nina Svjatopolsk-Mirsk. He served as an officer in the Imperial Russian Army for 20 years, but returned to Finland in 1882 when he was appointed the governor of the Vyborg province. In 1885 he was promoted chief of then Ministry of the Interior, also becoming a member of the Senate of Finland, where he often had heated debates with Leo Mechelin. He became Minister–Secretary of State for Finland in 1891, serving until 1898. He faced numerous difficult conflicts and uproar regarding what were seen as reductions of Finnish autonomy in the 1890s, such as the 1890  by tsar Alexander III and many others such as regarding criminal law and the entire state system of the Grand Duchy of Finland. He played a large part in negotiations concerning Finland with tsars Alexander III and Nicholas II. He resigned for health reasons on 11 June 1898. He died aged 62 in Rome, Italy.

All five of his children died without leaving children of their own, which meant that the family of von Daehn was registered as ended in the Finnish House of Nobility in 1971 when the youngest son died.

Gallery

References

1838 births
1900 deaths
People from Kouvola
People from Viipuri Province (Grand Duchy of Finland)
Finnish people of German descent
19th-century Finnish nobility
19th-century Finnish politicians
Finnish senators